The Kaieteur Tepui treefrog (Tepuihyla talbergae) is a species of frog in the family Hylidae endemic to Guyana.
This species is known only from the type locality, which is given as "Kaieteur Falls, 366 m asl (05° 10' N; 59° 28' W), Mazaruni-Potaro District, Guyana" (Duellman and Yoshpa 1996). It might occur more widely.

References

Tepuihyla
Endemic fauna of Guyana
Amphibians of Guyana
Taxonomy articles created by Polbot
Taxobox binomials not recognized by IUCN
Amphibians of the Tepuis